Kuolemanpalvelus is the third studio album by the Finnish death metal band Sotajumala. It entered the Finnish billboard charts at position 6 on its release week.

Track listing

Personnel
Mynni Luukkainen – vocals
Kosti Orbinski – guitar
Pete Lapio – guitar
Tomi Otsala – bass, backing vocals
Timo Häkkinen –  drums

References

2010 albums
Sotajumala albums